Melford Rural District was a rural district in the county of West Suffolk, England. It was created in 1894, under the Local Government Act 1894 from that part of the Sudbury rural sanitary district in West Suffolk (the rest becoming Belchamp Rural District in Essex). It was named after Long Melford and administered from Sudbury. Shortly after its creation, in 1896, the parish of Glemsford was made a separate urban district.

On 1 April 1935 it lost the parishes of Cavendish and Hawkedon to the Clare Rural District. At the same time the Glemsford Urban District was abolished and restored to the district.

Since 1 April 1974 it has formed part of the District of Babergh.

Parishes
At the time of its dissolution it consisted of the following 21 civil parishes.

Acton
Alpheton
Assington
Boxted
Bures St. Mary
Chilton
Glemsford
Great Cornard
Great Waldingfield
Hartest
Lawshall
Leavenheath
Little Cornard
Little Waldingfield
Long Melford
Nayland-with-Wissington
Newton
Shimpling
Somerton
Stanstead
Stoke-by-Nayland

Statistics

References

History of Suffolk
Local government in Suffolk
Districts of England abolished by the Local Government Act 1972
Districts of England created by the Local Government Act 1894
Rural districts of England